Mary Evans was the first love of Samuel Taylor Coleridge.

Mary Evans may also refer to:
Mary Beth Evans (born 1961), American actress
Mary Ann Evans (1819–1880), better known as George Eliot, writer
Mary Anne Disraeli (born Mary Anne Evans; (1792–1872), wife of Disraeli
Mary Evans (artist) (born 1963), British-Nigerian artist
Mary Evans (sect leader) (1735–1789), leader of a short-lived religious cult in Wales
Mary Forbes Evans (1936–2010), British writer and collector
Mary G. Evans (1891–1966), American Christian minister
Mary Jane Evans (1888–1922), Welsh teacher, preacher and actress

See also
Evans (disambiguation)